"So Damn Beautiful" is a single by New Zealand Idol season one runner-up, Michael Murphy, released in 2004. It was a #1 hit on the RIANZ charts.

Track listing

So Damn Beautiful
All We Are

2004 songs
2004 singles
Number-one singles in New Zealand